The Government of the 8th Dáil or the 7th Executive Council (8 February 1933 – 21 July 1937) was the Executive Council of the Irish Free State formed after the general election held on 24 January 1933. It was led by Fianna Fáil leader Éamon de Valera as President of the Executive Council, who had first taken office in the Irish Free State after the 1932 general election. De Valera had previously served as President of Dáil Éireann, or President of the Republic, from April 1919 to January 1922 during the revolutionary period of the Irish Republic.

The 7th Executive Council lasted for  days.

7th Executive Council of the Irish Free State

Nomination of President of the Executive Council
The 8th Dáil first met on 8 February. In the debate on the nomination of the President of the Executive Council, Fianna Fáil leader and outgoing President Éamon de Valera was proposed, and the motion was approved by 82 votes to 54. He was then appointed as president by Governor-General Domhnall Ua Buachalla.

Members of the Executive Council
The members of the Executive Council were proposed by the President and approved by the Dáil. They were appointed by the Governor-General on the same day.

Attorney General
Conor Maguire SC was appointed by the Governor-General as Attorney General on the nomination of the Executive Council.

Parliamentary Secretaries
On 8 February, the Executive Council appointed Parliamentary Secretaries on the nomination of the President.

Amendments to the Constitution of the Irish Free State
The following amendments to the Constitution of the Irish Free State were proposed by the Executive Council and passed by the Oireachtas.
 Constitution (Removal of Oath) Act 1933 (3 May 1933): Abolished the Oath of Allegiance and removed requirements that the constitution and laws of the Free State be compatible with the Anglo-Irish Treaty. This involved repealing Section 2 of the Constitution of the Irish Free State (Saorstát Éireann) Act 1922, as well as altering provisions of the constitution.
 Amendment No. 20 (2 November 1933): Removed the Governor General's role in recommending appropriations of money to the Dáil on the advice of the Executive Council. This function was transferred directly to the Executive Council. In practice this change was merely symbolic.
 Amendment No. 21 (2 November 1933): Removed provisions granting the Governor General the right to veto bills or reserve them "for the King's pleasure" by referring them to London.
 Amendment No. 22 (16 November 1933): Abolished the right of appeal to the Privy Council.
 Amendment No. 26 (5 April 1935): Made a technical change to Article 3, which dealt with citizenship.
 Amendment No. 23 (24 April 1936): Abolished the two university constituencies in the Dáil.
 Amendment No. 24 (29 May 1936): Abolished Seanad Éireann.
 Amendment No. 27 (11 December 1936): Abolished the office of Governor General and removed all reference to the King from the constitution. The functions of the Governor General were transferred to various other branches of government.

Role of King
As well as the constitutional changes above affecting the status of the British monarch, after the abdication of Edward VIII on 11 December 1936, the Executive Council proposed and passed the Executive Authority (External Relations) Act 1936 which reduced the role of the King to external functions only. It was followed the following year by the Executive Powers (Consequential Provisions) Act 1937, which completed the process of removing the position of Governor-General from Irish law.

Proposal of the Constitution of Ireland

The Executive Council proposed a new Constitution of Ireland which passed final stages in the Dáil on 14 June 1937. In a plebiscite held on 1 July 1937, the same date as a general election, the Constitution was approved with the support of 56.5% of votes cast. It came into force on 29 December 1937.

See also
Dáil Éireann (Irish Free State)
Politics of the Republic of Ireland

References

Ministries of George V
Ministries of Edward VIII
Government 08
Governments of the Irish Free State
1933 establishments in Ireland
1937 disestablishments in Ireland
Cabinets established in 1933
Cabinets disestablished in 1937
Minority governments
8th Dáil